Abraham III may refer to:

 Abraham III of Armenia (died 1737), Catholicos of the Armenian Apostolic Church
 Abraham III (Nestorian patriarch), first century Patriarch of the Church of the East

See also
Abraham I (disambiguation)
Abraham II (disambiguation)